Marta Tomac (born 20 September 1990) is a Norwegian-Croatian handball player for Vipers Kristiansand and the Norwegian national team.

She made her debut on the Norwegian national team in 2015.

Previously in her career she played 11 matches for the Croatian national team, and got a Norwegian citizenship in October 2015.

Personal life
She is the daughter of handball coach Željko Tomac.

Achievements
Olympic Games:
Bronze: 2020
European Championship
Winner: 2016, 2020
World Championship:
Winner: 2015
EHF Champions League:
Winner: 2020/2021, 2021/2022
Bronze medalist: 2018/2019
EHF Cup:
Finalist: 2018
The Norwegian League:
Winner: 2017/2018, 2018/2019, 2019/2020, 2020/2021, 2021/2022
Silver: 2016/2017
Norwegian Cup:
Winner: 2017, 2018, 2019, 2020, 2021, 2022/23

References

External links
 
 
 Marta Tomac at the Norwegian Handball Federation 
 
 

Croatian female handball players
Norwegian female handball players
Sportspeople from Trondheim
Croatian emigrants to Norway
Naturalised citizens of Norway
Living people
1990 births
Norwegian people of Croatian descent
Handball players at the 2020 Summer Olympics
Olympic bronze medalists for Norway
Medalists at the 2020 Summer Olympics
Olympic medalists in handball
Olympic handball players of Norway